Trevesia is a genus of flowering plants in the family Araliaceae. They are native to Southeast Asia. They are trees with spiny trunks. They grow in evergreen forest habitat. The genus is characterized by palmately lobed leaves, pedicels lacking articulations, at least six petals per flower, and at least six locules per ovary.

There are 7 species.

Species include:
Trevesia arborea
Trevesia beccarii
Trevesia burckii
Trevesia lateospina
Trevesia palmata
Trevesia sundaica
Trevesia valida

References

 
Apiales genera